Bernardine Anne Mobolaji Evaristo,  (born 28 May 1959) is a British author and academic. Her novel Girl, Woman, Other, jointly won the Booker Prize in 2019 alongside Margaret Atwood's The Testaments, making her the first woman with Black heritage to win the Booker.

Evaristo is Professor of Creative Writing at Brunel University London and President of the Royal Society of Literature, the second woman and the first person with Black heritage to hold the role since it was founded in 1820. 

Evaristo is a longstanding advocate for the inclusion of writers and artists of colour. She founded the Brunel International African Poetry Prize, 2012–2022, and initiated The Complete Works poetry mentoring scheme, 2007–2017. She co-founded Spread the Word writer development agency with Ruth Borthwick (1995–present) and Britain's first black women's theatre company (1982–1988), Theatre of Black Women. She organised Britain's first major black theatre conference, Future Histories, for the Black Theatre Forum, (1995) at the Royal Festival Hall, and Britain's first major conference on black British writing, Tracing Paper (1997) at the Museum of London.

Evaristo has received more than 77 honours, awards, fellowships, nominations and other tokens of recognition. She is a lifetime Honorary Fellow of St Anne's College, University of Oxford and International Honorary Member of the American Academy of Arts & Sciences. In 2021, she succeeded Sir Richard Eyre as President of Rose Bruford College of Theatre and Performance. Evaristo was Vice-Chair of the Royal Society of Literature (RSL) and in 2020 she became a lifetime vice president, before becoming president (2022–2026). She was appointed a Member of the Order of the British Empire (MBE) in the Queen's 2009 Birthday Honours, and an Officer of the Order of the British Empire (OBE) in the Queen's 2020 Birthday Honours, both for services to literature.

Early life and career
Evaristo was born in Eltham, south-east London, and christened Bernardine Anne Mobolaji Evaristo. She was raised in Woolwich, the fourth of eight children born to an English mother, Jacqueline M. Brinkworth, of English, Irish and German heritage, who was a schoolteacher, and a Nigerian father, Julius Taiwo Bayomi Evaristo (1927–2001), known as Danny, born in British Cameroon, raised in Nigeria, who migrated to Britain in 1949 and became a welder and the first black councillor in the Borough of Greenwich, for the Labour Party. Her paternal grandfather, Gregorio Bankole Evaristo, was a Yoruba Aguda who sailed from Brazil to Nigeria. He was a customs officer (d. 1927). Her paternal grandmother, Zenobia Evaristo, née Sowemima (d. 1967), was from Abeokuta in Nigeria.

Evaristo was educated at Eltham Hill Grammar School for Girls from 1970 to 1977, and in 1972 she joined Greenwich Young People's Theatre (now Tramshed, in Woolwich), about which she has said: "I was twelve years old and it was the making of my childhood and led to a life-long career spent in the arts." She went on to attend Rose Bruford College of Speech and Drama, graduating in 1982, 

In the 1980s, together with Paulette Randall and Patricia Hilaire, she founded Theatre of Black Women, the first theatre company in Britain of its kind. In the 1990s, she organised Britain's first black British writing conference, held at the Museum of London, and also Britain's first black British theatre conference, held at the Royal Festival Hall. In 1995 she co-founded and directed Spread the Word, London's writer development agency.

Evaristo continued further education at Goldsmiths College, University of London, receiving her doctorate in creative writing in 2013. In 2019, she was appointed Woolwich Laureate by the Greenwich and Docklands International Festival, reconnecting to and writing about the home town she left when she was 18.

Writer

Evaristo's first book to be published was a 1994 collection of poems called Island of Abraham. She went on to become the author of two non-fiction books, and eight books of fiction and verse fiction that explore aspects of the African diaspora. She experiments with form and narrative perspective, often merging the past with the present, fiction with poetry, the factual with the speculative, and reality with alternate realities (as in her 2008 novel Blonde Roots). Her verse novel The Emperor's Babe (Penguin, 2001) is about a black teenage girl, whose parents are from Nubia, coming of age in Roman London nearly 2,000 years ago. It won an Arts Council Writers' Award 2000, a NESTA Fellowship Award in 2003, and went on to be chosen by The Times as one of the 100 Best Books of the Decade in 2010, and it was adapted into a BBC Radio 4 play in 2013. Evaristo's fourth book, Soul Tourists (Penguin, 2005), is an experimental novel about a mismatched couple driving across Europe to the Middle East, which featured ghosts of real figures of colour from European history.

Her novel Blonde Roots (Penguin, 2008) is a satire that inverts the history of the transatlantic slave trade and replaces it with a universe where Africans enslave Europeans. Blonde Roots won the Orange Youth Panel Award and Big Red Read Award, and was nominated for the International Dublin Literary Award and the Orange Prize and the Arthur C. Clarke Award.

Evaristo's other books include the verse novel Lara (Bloodaxe Books, 2009, with an earlier version published in 1997), which fictionalised the multiple cultural strands of her family history going back over 150 years as well as her London childhood in a mixed-race family. This won the EMMA Best Novel Award in 1998. Her novella Hello Mum (Penguin, 2010) was chosen as "The Big Read" for the County of Suffolk, and adapted into a BBC Radio 4 play in 2012.

Her 2014 novel Mr Loverman (Penguin UK, 2013/ Akashic Books USA, 2014) is about a septuagenarian Caribbean Londoner, a closet homosexual considering his options after a 50-year marriage to his wife. It won the Publishing Triangle Ferro-Grumley Award for LGBT Fiction (USA) and the Jerwood Fiction Uncovered Prize. In 2015, she wrote and presented a two-part BBC Radio 4 documentary, Fiery Inspiration – about Amiri Baraka, on BBC Radio 4.

Evaristo's novel Girl, Woman, Other (May 2019, Hamish Hamilton/Penguin UK) is an innovative polyvocal "fusion fiction" about 12 primarily black British women. Their ages span 19 to 93 and they are a mix of cultural backgrounds, sexual orientations, classes and geographies, and the novel charts their hopes, struggles and intersecting lives. In July 2019, the novel was selected for the Booker Prize longlist, then made the shortlist, announced on 3 September 2019, alongside books by Margaret Atwood, Lucy Ellmann, Chigozie Obioma, Salman Rushdie and Elif Shafak. On 14 October, Girl, Woman, Other won the Booker Prize jointly with Atwood's The Testaments. The win made Evaristo the first woman with Black heritage and first British with Black heritage author to win the prize. Girl, Woman, Other was one of Barack Obama's 19 Favourite Books of 2019 and Roxane Gay's Favourite Book of 2019. The novel was also shortlisted for the 2020 Women's Prize for Fiction. 

In 2020, Evaristo won the British Book Awards: Fiction Book of the Year and Author of the Year, the Indie Book Award for Fiction. In June 2020, Evaristo became the first woman with Black heritage and the first British writer with Black heritage to reach number one in the UK paperback fiction charts, where she held the top spot for five weeks and spent 44 weeks in the Top 10.

Evaristo was included on the Powerlist 2021, the 14th edition of the annual Powerlist recognising the  United Kingdom's most influential people of African or African Caribbean heritage.

In 2022, Girl, Woman, Other was included on the "Big Jubilee Read" list of 70 books by Commonwealth authors chosen to celebrate the Platinum Jubilee of Elizabeth II.

Evaristo's writing also includes short fiction, drama, poetry, essays, literary criticism, and projects for stage and radio. Two of her books, The Emperor's Babe (2001) and Hello Mum (2010), have been adapted into BBC Radio 4 dramas. Her ninth book, Manifesto: On Never Giving Up, is published by Penguin UK (October 2021) and Grove Atlantic USA (2022). Her tenth book, Feminism (November 2021), is part of Tate Britain's "Look Again" series (Tate Publishing). She offers a personal survey of the representation of the art of British women of colour in the context of the gallery's forthcoming major rehang. In 2020 Evaristo collaborated with Valentino on their Collezione Milano collection, writing poetic text to accompany photographs of the collection by the photographer Liz Johnson Artur, published as a coffee-table book (Rizzoli, 2021).

Evaristo has written many articles, essays, fictions and book reviews for publications including: 
The Times, Vanity Fair, The Guardian, The Observer, The Independent, Vogue, Harper's Bazaar UK, The Times Literary Supplement, Conde Naste Traveller, Wasafiri, and the New Statesman. She is a contributor to New Daughters of Africa: An international anthology of writing by women of African descent (2019), edited by Margaret Busby.

Editor
Evaristo guest-edited The Sunday Times Style magazine (UK) in July 2020 with a black-woman/-xn takeover, featuring an array of young artists, activists and change-makers. A few years earlier, she was the guest editor of the September 2014 issue of Mslexia magazine, the Poetry Society of Great Britain's centenary winter issue of Poetry Review (2012), titled "Offending Frequencies"; a special issue of Wasafiri magazine called Black Britain: Beyond Definition (Routledge, 2010), with poet Karen McCarthy Woolf; Ten, an anthology of Black and Asian poets, with poet Daljit Nagra (Bloodaxe Books, 2010), and in 2007, she co-edited the New Writing Anthology NW15 (Granta/British Council). Evaristo was also editor of FrontSeat intercultural magazine in the 1990s, and one of the editors of Black Women Talk Poetry anthology (published in 1987 by the Black Womantalk Poetry collective of which Evaristo was part), Britain's first such substantial anthology, featuring among its 20 poets Jackie Kay, Dorothea Smartt and Adjoa Andoh. 

In October 2020, it was announced that Evaristo is curating a new book series with Hamish Hamilton at Penguin Random House publishers, "Black Britain: Writing Back", which involves bringing back into print and circulation books from the past. The first six books, novels, were published in February 2021, including Minty Alley (1936) by C. L. R. James and The Dancing Face (1997) by Mike Phillips.

Media appearances
Evaristo has been the subject of two major arts television documentary series: The South Bank Show, with Melvyn Bragg (Sky Arts, Autumn 2020) and Imagine, with Alan Yentob ("Bernardine Evaristo: Never Give Up", BBC One, September 2021). She has given many other interviews, including for HARDtalk, with Stephen Shakur (BBC World, 2020) and This Cultural Life, with John Wilson (BBC4, November 2021). She was also the subject of Profile (BBC Radio 4, 2019) and Desert Island Discs on BBC Radio 4, interviewed by Lauren Laverne, in 2020. In 2015, Evaristo wrote and presented a two-part BBC Radio 4 documentary called Fiery Inspiration: Amiri Baraka and the Black Arts Movement. 

Her many podcast appearances in Britain include interviews conducted by Adwoa Aboah, Samira Ahmed, Elizabeth Day, Grace Dent, Annie MacManus, Graham Norton, James O'Brien, Natalie Portman, Jay Rayner, Simon Savidge, Pandora Sykes and Jeremy Vine.

In the two months following her win of the Booker Prize, Evaristo has written that she received more invitations to give interviews than in the entirety of her career.

Teaching and touring
Evaristo has taught creative writing since 1994. She has also been awarded many writing fellowships and residencies including the Montgomery Fellowship at Dartmouth College in Hanover, New Hampshire in 2015; for the British Council at Georgetown University, Washington DC; Barnard College/ Columbia University, New York; University of the Western Cape, South Africa; the Virginia Arts Festival (Virginia, USA), and Writing Fellow at the University of East Anglia, UK. She taught the University of East Anglia-Guardian "How to Tell a Story" course for four seasons in London up until 2015. Evaristo is Professor of Creative Writing at Brunel University London, having taught at the university since 2011.

Since 1997, she has accepted more than 130 international invitations as a writer. These involve writer-residencies and visiting fellowships, British Council tours, book tours, teaching creative writing courses and workshops as well as keynotes, talks and panels at many conferences and literary festivals. She chaired the 32nd and 33rd British Council Berlin Literature Seminar in 2017 and 2018. She delivered the New Statesman/Goldsmiths Prize lecture on 30 September 2020. In October 2020, she gave the opening keynote address at the Frankfurt Book Fair's Publishing Insights conference, in which she called on publishers to hire more people represent a wider range of communities: "We have to have people working in the industry from all these communities who are looking for something beyond the cliches and stereotypes."

Other activities
Aside from founding the Brunel International African Poetry Prize, she has judged many prizes. In 2012 she was chair of the jury for both the Caine Prize for African Writing and the Commonwealth Short Story Prize. In 2021, she was Chair of the Women's Prize for Fiction panel of judges.

In 2006, Evaristo initiated an Arts Council-funded report delivered by Spread the Word writer development agency into why black and Asian poets were not getting published in the UK, which revealed that less than 1 per cent of all published poetry is by poets of colour.

When the report was published, she then initiated The Complete Works poetry mentoring scheme, with Nathalie Teitler and Spread the Word. In this national development programme, 30 poets were mentored, each over a one- or two-year period, and many went on to publish books, win awards and receive serious recognition for their poetry. (See The Complete Works alumnae list below.)

Evaristo has also served on councils and advisory committees for various organisations including the Council of the Royal Society of Literature (RSL) since 2017, the Arts Council of England, the London Arts Board, the British Council Literature Advisory Panel, the Society of Authors, the Poetry Society (Chair) and Wasafiri international literature magazine. Evaristo was elected as President of the Royal Society of Literature from the end of 2021 (following the retirement of her predecessor Dame Marina Warner), becoming the first writer of colour and only the second woman to hold the position in the Society's 200-year history, and she stated at the time of the announcement: "Literature is not a luxury, but essential to our civilisation. I am so proud, therefore, to be the figurehead of such an august and robust literature organisation that is so actively and urgently committed to being inclusive of the widest range of outstanding writers from every demographic and geographical location in Britain, and to reaching marginalised communities through literature projects, including introducing young people in schools to some of Britain's leading writers who visit, teach and discuss their work with them." As a Sky Arts Ambassador, Evaristo is spearheading the Sky Arts RSL Writers Awards, providing mentoring for under-represented writers.

A portrait of Evaristo (2002) by photographer Sal Idriss is in the collection of the National Portrait Gallery, London.

Personal life
She is married to writer David Shannon, whom she met in 2006, and whose debut novel was launched in March 2021.

Awards and recognition
 1999: EMMA Best Book Award for Lara
 2000: Arts Council England Writer's Award 2000, for The Emperor's Babe
 2002: UEA Writing Fellow, University of East Anglia
 2003: National Endowment of Science, Technology and the Arts (NESTA) Fellowship Award
 2004: Elected a Fellow, Royal Society of Literature (est.1820)
 2006: British Council Fellow, Georgetown University, USA
 2006: Elected a Fellow, Royal Society of Arts (est.1754)
 2009: Arthur C. Clarke Award, nominated for Blonde Roots
 2009: Awarded an MBE in the Queen's Birthday Honours List for services to Literature
 2009: Big Red Read Award, Fiction and overall winner for Blonde Roots 
 2009: International Dublin Literary Award, nominated for Blonde Roots
 2009: Orange Prize for Fiction, nominated for Blonde Roots
 2009: Orange Prize Youth Panel Award for Blonde Roots
 2010: Hurston/Wright Legacy Award, USA (finalist)
 2010: Poetry Book Society Commendation for Ten, co-edited with Daljit Nagra
 2010: The Emperor's Babe, The Times (UK) "100 Best Books of the Decade"
 2014: Jerwood Fiction Uncovered Prize
 2015:  The Montgomery Fellow, Dartmouth College, USA
 2015: Triangle Publishing Awards: Ferro-Grumley Award for LGBT Fiction, USA
 2017: Elected an Honorary Fellow, the English Association (est.1906)
 2018: Elected a Fellow of Rose Bruford College of Theatre & Performance
 2019: Financial Times: list of 14 women gamechangers
 2019: Goodread's Choice Award Best Fiction (finalist)
 2019: Gordon Burn Prize (finalist)
 2019: Winner of the Booker Prize for Girl, Woman, Other
 2020: Australian Book Industry Awards (nominated)
 2020: Awarded an OBE in the Queen's 2020 Birthday Honours for services to literature
 2020: British Book Awards: Author of the Year 
 2020: British Book Awards: Fiction Book of the Year
 2020: Elle 50 – list of Britain's gamechangers
 2020: Ferro-Grumley Award USA (finalist)
 2020: Gold Medal of Honorary Patronage (est. 1683), Trinity College Dublin
 2020: Indie Book Award for Fiction
 2020: Le Prix Millepage, France
 2020: Lifetime Honorary Fellow, St Anne's College, University of Oxford
 2020: Lifetime Vice President, Royal Society of Literature 
 2020: Orwell Prize (finalist)
 2020: Reading Women Award
 2020: The Bookseller 150 power list 
 2020: The Glass Bell Awards (finalist)
 2020: The Vogue 25 for 2020 – list of Britain's 25 most influential women
 2020: Visionary Honours Awards – finalist for Girl, Woman, Other 
 2020: Voted one of 100 Great Black Britons
 2020: Women's Prize for Fiction (finalist)
 2021: European Literature Award, Holland (finalist)
 2021: Freedom of the Borough Award, Royal Borough of Greenwich
 2021: GG2 Woman of the Year Award
 2021: Glamour magazine Woman of the Year, Gamechanging Author Award
 2021: Honorary International Fellow, American Academy of Arts & Sciences (est. 1780)
 2021: International Dublin Literary Award (finalist)
 2021: Nielsen Gold Bestseller Award 
 2021: Person of the Year – as the 151st honoree of The Booksellers 150 Power List.
 2021: Premio Gregor von Rezzori (Italy) (finalist)
 2021: Premio Lattes Grinzane (Italy) (finalist)
 2021: President of Rose Bruford College of Theatre and Performance 
 2021: The UK Black Powerlist 100 
 2021: The Bookseller 150 power list
 2021: Vanity Fair magazine Challenger Award
 2022: Appointed President, Royal Society of Literature (2022–2026)
 2022: Bestsellery Empiku Award (Poland) – finalist
 2022: Forbes "50 over 50" honoree for the Europe, Middle East & Africa region
 2022: Honorary Doctor of Arts and Letters, Kings College London
 2022: Honorary Doctor of Letters, Queen Mary University of London
 2022: Honorary Doctor of Letters, Glasgow Caledonian University
 2022: Honorary Doctor of Letters, University of Greenwich
 2022: Honorary Fellow, Goldsmiths, University of London 2022: Honorary Doctor of Arts, London South Bank University 
 2022  Honorary Fellow, CILIP, The Library and Information Association
 2022: Plebiscyt Ksiazka Roku 2021/ Literatura Piekna (Poland) for Girl, Woman Other – finalist
 2022: Sky Arts: Britain's 50 Most Influential Artists of the Past 50 years (No. 26)
 2022: Soho House Awards: Writer
 2022: Stylist magazine Remarkable Women Awards: Writer of the Year
 2022: The UK Black Black Powerlist 100 
 2022: Visionary Honours Book of the Year 2021 – finalist for Manifesto

Academic honours 
 2014: Appointed The Public Orator, Brunel University London
 2015: CBASS Award for Excellence, Brunel University London
 2017: Teach Brunel Award, Brunel University London
 2020: Vice Chancellor's Award for Staff, Brunel University London
 2022: CBASS Lecturer of the Year, Brunel University London

Books 
1994: Island of Abraham (poems, Peepal Tree Press)
1997: Lara (novel, Angela Royal Publishing)
2001: The Emperor's Babe (verse novel, Hamish Hamilton/Penguin; Penguin USA, 2002)
2005: Soul Tourists (novel, Hamish Hamilton/Penguin)
2008: Blonde Roots (novel, Hamish Hamilton/Penguin; Riverhead/Penguin USA, 2009)
2009: Lara (new, expanded edition, (Bloodaxe Books)
2010: Hello Mum (novella, Penguin UK)
2014: Mr Loverman (novel, Penguin UK; Akashic Books)
2019: Girl, Woman, Other (novel, Hamish Hamilton/Penguin)
2021: Manifesto: On Never Giving Up (memoir, Hamish Hamilton/Penguin)
2021: Feminism (Look Again Series, Tate Galleries Publishing)

Plays
 1982: Moving Through, a choral dramatic poem, Talking Black Festival, Royal Court Theatre Upstairs
 1982: Tiger Teeth Clenched Not to Bite, a poetic monologue. Theatre of Black Women, the Melkweg, Amsterdam
 1983: Silhouette, an experimental verse drama. Theatre of Black Women tour. Co-writer: Patricia St. Hilaire
 1984: Pyeyucca, an experimental verse drama. Theatre of Black Women tour. Additional material: Patricia St. Hilaire
 2002: Medea – Mapping the Edge. Verse drama. Wilson Wilson Company at Sheffield Crucible Theatre and BBC Radio Drama
 2003: Madame Bitterfly and the Stockwell Diva. Verse drama. The Friday Play, BBC Radio 4, starring Rudolph Walker, Clare Perkins, Dona Croll 
 2020: First, Do No Harm, a poetic monologue, Old Vic Theatre online, directed by Adrian Lester and produced by Lolita Chakrabarti, starring Sharon D. Clarke.

Short fiction (selected) 

1994: "Letters from London" in Miscegenation Blues: voices of mixed-race women, edited by Carol Camper (Sister Vision Press)
2005: On Top of the World (BBC Radio 4)
2006: "Ohtakemehomelord.com" in The Guardians annual short story supplement (July)
2008: "A Matter of Timing", The Guardian
2010: "On Top of the World", The Mechanics Institute Review, Issue 7 (Birkbeck, University of London)
2011: "I Think I'm Going Slightly Mad" in One for the Trouble, The Book Slam Annual, edited by Patrick Neate (Book Slam Productions)
2014: "Our Billy, (or should it be Betty?)" in Letter to an Unknown Soldier, 14–18 NOW UK WW1 Centenary Art Commissions (William Collins/HarperCollins)
 2015: "Yoruba Man Walking" in Closure: a new anthology of contemporary black British fiction, edited by Jacob Ross (Peepal Tree Press)
 2016: "The Human World" in How Much the Heart Can Hold, edited by Emma Herdman (Hodder & Stoughton)
 2020: "Star of the Season", British Vogue 
 2020: "The White Man's Liberation Front", New Statesman

Essays 
1992: "Black Theatre", Artrage (Winter/Spring)
1993: "Black Women in Theatre", Six Plays by Black and Asian Women Writers, edited by Kadjia George (Aurora Metro Press)
1996: "Going it Alone" – one-person shows in black British theatre, Artrage 
1998: "On Staying Power" by Peter Fryer for BBC Windrush Education 
2001: "Roaring Zora" on the life and writing of Zora Neale Hurston, Marie Claire 
2005: "An Introduction to Contemporary British Poetry", British Council Literature Magazine 
2005: "False Memory Syndrome: Writing Black in Britain", in Writing Worlds (New Writing Partnership/University of East Anglia)
2005: "Origins", Crossing Borders, British Council online
2005: "The Road Less Travelled", Necessary Journeys, edited by Melanie Keen and Eileen Daley, Arts Council England
2007: "Writing the Past: Traditions, Inheritances, Discoveries" in Writing Worlds 1: The Norwich Exchanges (University of East Anglia/Pen & Inc Press)
2008: "CSI Europe: African Trace Elements. Fragments. Reconstruction. Case Histories. Motive. Personal", Wasafiri (Taylor & Francis) 
2009: Autobiographical essay, Contemporary Writers, Vol. 275 (Gale Publishing, USA)
2009: Autobiographical essay, "My Father's House" (Five Dials)
2010: Introduction to Ten poetry anthology, "Why This, Why Now?", on the need for The Complete Works initiative to diversify British poetry publications (Bloodaxe Books)
2010: Introduction to Wasafiri Black Britain: Beyond Definition, "The Illusion of Inclusion", Issue 64, Winter 2010 (Routledge)
2010: "The Month of September", on writing and process, Volume 100:4, Winter 2010 Poetry Review
2011: "Myth, Motivation, Magic & Mechanics", Body of Work: 40 Years of Creative Writing at UEA (University of East Anglia), edited by Giles Foden (Full Circle Editions)
2013: The Book that Changed Me Series: Essay on For colored girls who have considered suicide when the rainbow is enuf by Ntozake Shange (BBC Radio 3)
2016: "The Privilege of Being a Mixed Race Woman", Tangled Roots: Real Life Stories from Mixed Race Britain, Anthology Number 2, edited by Katy Massey (Tangled Roots)
2019: "What a Time to be a (Black) (British) (Womxn) Writer", in Brave New Words, edited by Susheila Nasta (Myriad Editions)
2020: "Claiming Whiteness", The House magazine, of the (Houses of Parliament)
2020: Foreword to Bedside Guardian, the annual Guardian anthology
2020: Foreword: "Re:Thinking: 'Diversity' in Publishing", by Dr Anamik Saha and Dr Sandra van Lente (Goldsmiths University/Newgen Publishing UK)
2020: "Gender in the Blender", for A Point of View, BBC Radio 4
2020: Introduction to Loud Black Girls, edited by Yomi Adegoke and Elizabeth Uviebinené (HarperCollins) 
2020: "Literature Can Foster Our Shared Humanity", British Vogue, 6 June 2020.
2020: "Loving the Body Fat-tastic", for A Point of View, BBC Radio 4
2020: "On Mrs Dalloway", BBC Radio 4
2020: "Spiritual Pick and Mix", for A Point of View, BBC Radio 4
2020: "The Longform Patriarchs and their Accomplices", New Statesman
2020: "The Pro-Mask Movement", for A Point of View, BBC Radio 4
2020: "Theatre of Black Women: A Personal Account", in The Palgrave Handbook of the History of Women on Stage, edited by Jan Sewell and Clare Smout (Palgrave Macmillan)
2020: "Why Black Lives Matter", for A Point of View, BBC Radio 4
2021: Introduction to Beloved by Toni Morrison (Vintage)
2021: Introduction to Bernard and the Cloth Monkey by Judith Bryan (1998), "Black Britain: Writing Back" series (Hamish Hamilton/Penguin reissue)
2021: Introduction to Black Teacher by Beryl Gilroy (Faber and Faber)
2021: Introduction to for Colored Girls Who Have Considered Suicide / When the Rainbow Is Enuf by Ntozake Shange (Orion)
2021: Introduction to Incomparable World by S. I. Martin (1996), "Black Britain: Writing Back" series (Hamish Hamilton/Penguin reissue)
2021: Introduction to Minty Alley by C. L. R. James (1936), "Black Britain: Writing Back" series (Hamish Hamilton/Penguin reissue)
2021: Introduction to The Dancing Face by Mike Phillips (1997), "Black Britain: Writing Back" series (Hamish Hamilton/Penguin reissue)
2021: Introduction to The Fat Lady Sings by Jacqueline Roy (2000), "Black Britain: Writing Back" series (Hamish Hamilton/Penguin reissue)
2021: Introduction to Without Prejudice by Nicola Williams (1997), "Black Britain: Writing Back" series (Hamish Hamilton/Penguin reissue)
2022: "The Artistic Triumph of Older Black Women", The Guardian

Editor 
1987: Editor, with Da Choong, Olivette Cole-Wilson, and Gabriela Pearse, Black Women Talk Poetry anthology
1996–1997: Editor, FrontSeat quarterly inter-cultural performance magazine (Black Theatre Forum) 
1998–2008: associate editor, Wasafiri international literature journal (Queen Mary University London and Open University)
2007: Editor, with Maggie Gee, NW15: New Writing Anthology, 15th annual edition (British Council and Granta)
2010: Editor, with Daljit Nagra, Ten: New Poets poetry anthology, introducing ten new poets from The Complete Works project (Bloodaxe Books)
2010: guest editor, with Karen McCarthy Woolf, Wasafiri, Black Britain: Beyond Definition, Special Winter Issue (Routledge)
2012: guest editor, Poetry Review, Offending Frequencies for The Poetry Society of Great Britain, Special Centenary Winter Issue, Volume 102.4
2014: Editorial Selector, the Commonwealth Writers Short Story Prize anthology, Let's Tell This Story Properly, edited by Ellah Allfrey (Dundern Press, Canada)
2014: guest editor, Mslexia quarterly magazine of creative writing, Issue Number 63 
2014–2020, Originator and supervising editor of annual student anthologies at Brunel University London: The Voices Inside Our Heads, The Psyche Supermarket, The Imagination Project, It's Complicated, Totem, Pendulum and Letter to My Younger Self 2019, Kintsugi
2014–ongoing. Editorial Board, the African Poetry Book Fund, with Prairie Schooner poetry magazine at the University of Nebraska
2020: guest editor, The Sunday Times Style magazine

Literary prize juries
 1997: Ian St. James Award (Fiction)
 2004: The Next Generation Top 20 List, organised by PBS and Poetry Society
 2006: The National Poetry Competition
 2007: Northern Rock Writers' Award (Fiction & Poetry)
 2008: Decibel Penguin Prize (Fiction)
 2009: Muslim Writers Awards with Penguin Publishers (Fiction)
 2010: Alfred Fagon Award – (Black plays)
 2010: Orange Award for New Writers (Women's fiction)
 2010: T. S. Eliot Prize (Poetry)
 2011: Peacock Poetry Prize (Brighton Festival)
 2012: Chair: Caine Prize for African Fiction
 2012: Chair: Commonwealth Short Story Prize
 2012: Founder & Chair of the Brunel University African Poetry Prize
 2012: The Poetry Society's Poetry News competition
 2013: Chair: The Brunel International African Poetry Prize
 2013: Golden Baobab Prize, Ghana (Short stories for African children)
 2013: Sillerman First Book Prize for African Poets (USA)
 2014: Chair: The Brunel International African Poetry Prize
 2014: OCM Bocas Prize for Caribbean Literature, Poetry (Trinidad)
 2014: Sillerman First Book Prize for African Poets, USA
 2015: Chair: The Brunel International African Poetry Prize
 2015: Costa Book Award Best Novel & Costa Book of the Year
 2015: First Story National Writing Competition
 2015: Prairie Schooner First Book Prize (USA)
 2016: Chair: The Brunel International African Poetry Prize
 2016: Goldsmiths Prize for innovative fiction
 2016: Guardian and 4th Estate BAME Short Story Prize
 2016: Sillerman First Book Prize for African Poets (USA)
 2017: Chair: Brunel International African Poetry Prize
 2018: 40 New Fellows under 40 Royal Society of Literature
 2018: Chair: Brunel International African Poetry Prize
 2018: Geneva Writers' Prize 
 2018: Isis magazine Writing Competition, Oxford University
 2018: The Queen's Commonwealth Essay Competition
 2019: Anthony Burgess/Observer newspaper Award for Arts' Journalism
 2019: Glenna Luschei Prize for African Poetry
 2019: Harper's Short Story Award
 2019: Polari Book Prize for LGBTQ+ fiction
 2020: Chair, Women's Prize for Fiction
 2020: Sunday Times Style Journalism Competition

Voluntary advisory
 Board of directors, Black Mime Theatre Company, 1990s
 Advisory board: Wasafiri Literature Magazine, 2000–
 General Council: The Poetry Society of Great Britain, 2001–2004
 Special Literature Advisor: London Arts Board, 2001–2005
 Chair: The Poetry Society of Great Britain, 2003–2004
 Literature Advisor: The British Council, 2003–2006
 Advisory Committee: New Galleries, Museum of London, 2004–2008
 Advisory Board: MA Creative Writing, City University, 2004–2009
 Founder: Free Verse & The Complete Works schemes, 2005–2017
 The Society of Authors Management Committee, 2008–2009
 Patron: Westminster Befriend a Family (WBAF), 2009–2011
 Editorial Board: the African Poetry Book Series, APBF, University of Nebraska, 2012– 
 Patron: SI Leeds Literary Prize for unpublished black/Asian women writers, 2012– 
 The Folio Prize, Member of the Academy, 2013– 
 Arts Council England, Member of the South East Area Council, 2014–2015
 Quality Assurance Agency for Higher Education Creative Writing Panel, 2014–2015
 Elected to Council, Royal Society of Literature, 2016– 
 Vice Chair, Royal Society of Literature, 2017–2020

The Complete Works alumnae 
Group One
 Rowyda Amin
 Malika Booker
 Janet Kofi-Tsekpo
 Mir Mahfuz Ali
 Nick Makoha
 Karen McCarthy Woolf
 Shazea Quraishi
 Roger Robinson
 Denise Saul
 Seni Seneviratne
Group Two
 Mona Arshi
 Jay Bernard
 Kayo Chingonyi
 Rishi Dastidar
 Edward Doegar
 Inua Ellams
 Sarah Howe
 Eileen Pun
 Adam Lowe
 Warsan Shire
Group Three
 Raymond Antrobus
 Leo Boix
 Natacha Bryan
 Victoria-Anne Bulley
 Will Harris
 Ian Humphreys
 Momtaza Mehri
 Yomi Sode
 Degna Stone
 Jennifer Lee Tsai

Notes

References

External links

Official website
"Bernardine Evaristo", Contemporary Writers, British Council.
Bernardine Evaristo at Diaspora Writers UK.
Toh Hsien Min, "Never Forgetting The Source — Bernardine Evaristo makes productive use of history" (interview), Quarterly Literary Review Singapore, Vol. 3, No. 2, January 2004.
 Curry, Ginette. "Toubab La!": Literary Representations of Mixed-race Characters in the African Diaspora, Newcastle, England: Cambridge Scholars Publishing, 2007.
Rosanna Greenstreet, "Bernardine Evaristo: 'How often do I have sex? Eight times a day, The Q&A, The Guardian, 25 July 2020.
Benjamin Law, "Booker winner Bernardine Evaristo on a society where we say, 'I look good for my age, The Sydney Morning Herald, 29 October 2021.

1959 births
Living people
21st-century British novelists
21st-century British poets
21st-century British women writers
Academics of Brunel University London
Alumni of Goldsmiths, University of London
Black British women academics
Black British women writers
Booker Prize winners
British expatriate academics in the United States
English people of German descent
English people of Irish descent
English people of Yoruba descent
Fellows of the English Association
Fellows of the Royal Society of Literature
New Statesman people
Officers of the Order of the British Empire
People from Woolwich
Writers from London